Bo Phloi is a district (amphoe) of Kanchanaburi province, central Thailand.

History
The minor district (king amphoe) Bo Phloi was created by splitting off some parts of Mueang Kanchanaburi district. It was upgraded to a full district on 16 July 1963.

Geography
Neighboring districts are (from the south clockwise) Tha Muang, Mueang Kanchanaburi, Si Sawat, Nong Prue, Lao Khwan, Huai Krachao, and Phanom Thuan of Kanchanaburi Province.

Administration
The district is divided into six sub-districts (tambons), which are further subdivided into 77 villages (mubans). There are two townships (thesaban tambons) within the district. Nong Ri covers parts of tambon Nong Ri, and Bo Phloi covers parts of tambons Bo Phloi and Chong Dan. There are a further six tambon administrative organizations.

Missing numbers are tambon which now form Nong Prue District.

References

External links
amphoe.com

Bo Phloi